WUPZ (94.9 FM) is a radio station licensed to Chocolay Charter Township, Michigan serving the Marquette, Michigan market. The station is currently owned by Armada Media Corporation, through licensee AMC Partners Escanaba, LLC, and was granted its license on September 29, 2006. The station signed on in May 2009 with a Top 40 (CHR) format. WUPZ has a rhythmic lean to it. The station air staff includes Jason Lee, Cory Lane, Kirk Sanders and Jon Perrault.

External links
 www.radioresultsnetwork.com/thebay
 

UPZ
Contemporary hit radio stations in the United States
Radio stations established in 1985